Sexy time may refer to:
 Sex in the "unfluent English" of the Borat character
 nickname of Yangervis Solarte (born 1987), Venezuelan former professional baseball player